Roman Igorevich Kontsedalov (born 11 May 1986) is a Russian former footballer. His position was midfielder.

Career
On 16 January 2015, Kontsedalov moved to FC Anzhi Makhachkala on loan from FC Volga Nizhny Novgorod.

Personal life
His younger brother Aleksei Kontsedalov is also a professional football player.

References

External links 
 Lokomotiv Moscow Profile

1986 births
People from Valuyki, Belgorod Oblast
Living people
Russian footballers
Russia under-21 international footballers
Russia national football B team footballers
FC Lokomotiv Moscow players
FC Tom Tomsk players
Association football midfielders
Russian Premier League players
PFC Spartak Nalchik players
FC Mordovia Saransk players
FC Volga Nizhny Novgorod players
FC Anzhi Makhachkala players
FC Kuban Krasnodar players
FC Rotor Volgograd players
FC Energomash Belgorod players
Sportspeople from Belgorod Oblast